Season 2003–04 was Airdrie United's second competitive season. They competed in the Second Division, Challenge Cup, League Cup and the Scottish Cup.

Summary
Airdrie United finished first in the Second Division and were promoted to the First Division. They reached the third round of the Scottish Cup, the second round of the League Cup and reached the final of the Challenge Cup. Airdrie finished Runners-up, losing 2–0 to Inverness.

League table

Results and fixtures

Second Division

Challenge Cup

League Cup

Scottish Cup

Player statistics

Squad 

|}
a.  Includes other competitive competitions, including playoffs and the Scottish Challenge Cup.

References

Airdrieonians F.C. seasons
Airdrie United